Nozhay-Yurtovsky District (Naƶi-Yürtan khoşt) is an administrative and municipal district (raion), one of the fifteen in the Chechen Republic, Russia. It is located in the east of the republic. Its administrative center is the rural locality (a selo) of Nozhay-Yurt. Population:  40,542 (2002 Census);  The population of Nozhay-Yurt accounts for 13.6% of the district's total population.

Healthcare
Overall health performance indicators of the district are much worse than officially reflected, considering the remote geographic location of the district and that most of its populace has limited access to state health care. As of 2004, the mortality rates were among the highest in the republic.

References

Notes

Sources

Districts of Chechnya

